Underwood Glacier is a channel glacier in Wilkes Land, Antarctica about  long, flowing to the Antarctic coast between Reist Rocks and Cape Nutt. It was mapped in 1955 by G. D. Blodgett from aerial photographs taken by U.S. Navy Operation Highjump in 1947 and named by Advisory Committee on Antarctic Names (US-ACAN) after Lieutenant Thomas Joseph Underwood, Jr., USMC, who served on the sloop Vincennes of the United States Exploring Expedition (1838–42) under Lieutenant Charles Wilkes.

See also
 List of glaciers in the Antarctic
 Glaciology

References
 

Glaciers of Wilkes Land